Konow may refer to:

People
 Agnes von Konow (1868–1944), Finnish animal rights advocate
 Fredrik Ludvig Konow (1864–1954), Norwegian businessman
 Friedrich Wilhelm Konow (1842–1908), German entomologist, specialising in Hymenoptera
 Henri Konow (1862–1939), Danish admiral
 Karsten Konow (1918–1945), Norwegian Olympic sailor 1936
 Magnus Konow (1887–1972), Norwegian Olympic sailor 1908–1948
 Sten Konow (1867–1948), Norwegian Indologist
 Thomas Konow (1796–1881), Norwegian naval officer
 Wollert Konow (Prime Minister of Norway) (1845–1924), Prime Minister of Norway 1910–1912

Places
 Konow, Iran